Cara Y Cruz: Walang Sinasanto is a 1996 Philippine action comedy film directed by Jun Aristorenas. The film stars Raymart Santiago and Dennis Padilla.

The film is streaming online on YouTube.

Plot
Berting (Raymart), a convict who was a former seminarian, escapes from prison and takes hostage of Boggart (Dennis), a cab driver. After a series of events, they land in a primitive island where its inhabitants are controlled by a religious cult led by Tata Negro (Efren).

Cast
 Raymart Santiago as Berting
 Dennis Padilla as Boggart
 Jun Aristorenas as Don Sebastian
 Efren Reyes Jr. as Tata Negro
 Donita Rose as Belen
 Amanda Page as Hilda
 Perla Bautista as Aling Ason
 Errol Dionisio as Bankero
 Glydel Mercado as Berting's Girl
 Ana Bautista as Provincial Bar Girl
 Junar Aristorenas as Ador

Production
Production of the film took several months in 1995. At one point, Jun Aristorenas was taken ill, causing some delays in production. The film was slated to be released sometime in November that year, but was reportedly shelved. It was finally released in March 1996.

References

External links

Full Movie on Viva Films

1996 films
1996 action comedy films
Filipino-language films
Philippine action comedy films
Viva Films films